Rowing was an African Games event at its inaugural edition in 2007 in Algiers, Algeria. The second African Games rowing regatta took place at the 2019 African Games in Rabat, Morocco.

Editions

External links
 World Rowing e-Magazine (worldrowingmagazine.com)

 
Sports at the African Games
Rowing in Africa
All-Africa Games